Mousa Kalantari (born 1949 in Marand — assassinated 28 June 1981 in Tehran) was the cabinet minister of transportation in the government of Abolhassan Banisadr. He was the elder brother of Isa Kalantari.

Kalantari was killed in a terrorist attack on 28 June 1981, when a bomb exploded during a political party conference (Hafte tir bombing) with 73 other attendees.

See also
 Isa Kalantari

References

People from Marand
1949 births
1981 deaths
Assassinated Iranian politicians
Government ministers of Iran
Amirkabir University of Technology alumni
Islamic Republican Party politicians